Pedro Moncayo y Esparza (29 June 1807 in Ibarra, Ecuador — February 1888 in Valparaíso, Chile) was an Ecuadorian journalist and politician. He was the son of an Ecuadorian mother and Colombian father. He was politically active during the period of Caudillismo of Ecuador, being an opponent of the caudillos, writing for the weekly newspaper El Quiteño Libre. He later became diplomatically active and was ambassador to Peru, France and the United Kingdom. He lived the remainder of his life in Chile, dying in Valparaíso.

Pedro Moncayo Canton in Pichincha Province is named after him.

References

1807 births
1888 deaths
Ecuadorian people of Colombian descent
People from Ibarra, Ecuador
Ecuadorian journalists
Ecuadorian politicians
Ambassadors of Ecuador to Peru
Ambassadors of Ecuador to France
Ambassadors of Ecuador to the United Kingdom
19th-century journalists
Male journalists
19th-century male writers